Triggerfinger is a 2013 song by Norwegian pop band Donkeyboy featuring uncredited vocals from Canadian musician Kiesza. It was released in Norway on 23 August 2013. The song peaked at number 9 on the Finnish Singles Chart.

Track listing

Chart performance

Weekly charts

Release history

References

Donkeyboy songs
2013 songs
Warner Music Group singles
2013 singles
Kiesza songs
Songs written by Kiesza
Songs written by Espen Berg (musician)
Songs written by Simen Eriksrud
Songs written by Cato Sundberg